TV Guide is a weekly New Zealand magazine that lists the country's television programs for each week.

History and profile
TV Guide was started in 1986 as a section in Truth magazine. Soon it became a separate publication. It is published by media business Stuff Ltd, from its Auckland office.

Regular features 
 Stuff to watch – The best of online viewing
 Highlights – The best of the week's viewing
 TV Movies – more information on movies on television this week
 Sport – the sports news
 Mr Telly – readers share their views about what is on television
 This week in history – Things that happened in history for the week covered
 Horoscopes – horoscope for the week
 Puzzle Fun – puzzles
 Kids' Club – Games, puzzles and prizes for children

Staff 
 Julie Eley - Editor
 Chris Bush - Deputy Editor
 Kristie Rogers - Art Director
 Sarah Nealon - Journalist
 Melenie Parkes - Journalist

References

External links
 

1986 establishments in New Zealand
Listings magazines
Magazines established in 1986
Mass media in Auckland
Magazines published in New Zealand
Weekly magazines published in New Zealand
Stuff (company)
Television in New Zealand
Television magazines